Salerno is a town in Campania, Italy

Salerno may also refer to:

 Principality of Salerno, a South Italian state
 Province of Salerno, Campania, Italy
 Salerno (surname)
 Salerno (horse), an American racehorse
 Salerno horse, a horse breed

See also
 FOB Salerno
 Port Salerno, Florida
 Port of Salerno, a port in Salerno, Italy
 Salerno Bay
 Salerno Cathedral
 Salerno Lake
 Salerno-Sonnenberg
 Schola Medica Salernitana
 Salorno, an Italian municipality of South Tyrol 

bg:Салерно